Katherine Alexandra Cruise O'Brien (26 May 1948 – 26 March 1998) was an Irish writer.

The third and youngest child of Irish politician and diplomat Conor Cruise O'Brien and Christine Foster, she was born in Dublin, and grew up in Howth. She went to school in Dublin and studied English in Trinity College Dublin. Her mother, Christine Foster, was born in Derry and was raised in Belfast. Christine's father, Alec Foster, was headmaster of Belfast Royal Academy, and played international rugby for Ireland and the British and Irish Lions.

While still at university, Kate Cruise O'Brien published her first short story and shortly afterwards, at the age of 22 she won the Hennessy Literary Award. She graduated in 1971 and married Joseph Kearney, son of a former secretary to the Department of Defence. She returned to university to study for a Higher Diploma in Education. Unable to find a teaching post she started a small nursery for the children of working mothers.

Her first book, A Gift Horse, a collection of short stories, won her the Rooney Prize for Irish Literature. Seán Ó Faoláin described it as containing "the seed of genius". She later became a literary editor with the Poolbeg Press, and became well known for her canny knack of uncovering new talent.

Personal life
In 1971, she married Joseph Kearney; the couple had one child. Kate Cruise O'Brien died suddenly in 1998 in Dublin.

Works
A Gift Horse, and Other Stories (1977), Poolbeg Press
The Homesick Garden (1991), Poolbeg Press
If Only: Short Stories of Love and Divorce (1997), Poolbeg Press (co-editor)
In Sunshine Or in Shadow (1999), Poolbeg Press (co-editor)

References

External links

1948 births
1998 deaths
Irish writers
Irish poets
People from County Dublin